Debate is a process that involves formal discourse  on a particular topic, often including a moderator and audience. In a debate, arguments are put forward for often opposing viewpoints. Debates have historically occurred in public meetings, academic institutions, debate halls, coffeehouses, competitions, and legislative assemblies. Debate has also been conducted for educational and recreational purposes, usually associated with educational establishments and debating societies. These debates put an emphasis upon logical consistency, factual accuracy, and emotional appeal to an audience. Modern forms of competitive debate also include rules for participants to discuss and decide upon the framework of the debate (how the debate will be judged).

History 

Debating in various forms has a long history and can be traced back to the philosophical and political debates of Ancient Greece, such as Athenian democracy or Shastrartha in Ancient India. Modern forms of debating and the establishment of debating societies occurred during the Age of Enlightenment in the 18th century.

Emergence of debating societies 

Trinity College Dublin boasts two of Europe's oldest debating societies: The Phil, founded in 1683, and The Hist in 1770, inspired by a debating club created by Edmund Burke in 1747. Debating societies emerged in London in the early 18th century, and soon became a prominent societal fixture of life in London. Although debating societies had existed in London since at least 1740, they were exclusive and secretive societies. However, by the mid-18th century, London fostered a vibrant debating society culture, largely due to increased membership from London's growing middle-class. Debating topics covered a broad spectrum of topics while the debating societies allowed participants from all genders and social backgrounds, making them an example of the enlarged public sphere of the Age of Enlightenment. Debating societies were a phenomenon associated with the simultaneous rise of the public sphere, a sphere of discussion separate from traditional authorities and accessible to all people that acted as a platform for criticism and the development of new ideas and philosophy.

John Henley, a clergyman, founded an Oratory in 1726 with the principal purpose of "reforming the manner in which such public presentations should be performed." He made extensive use of the print industry to advertise the events of his Oratory, making it an omnipresent part of the London public sphere. Henley was also instrumental in constructing the space of the debating club: he added two platforms to his room in the Newport district of London to allow for the staging of debates, and structured the entrances to allow for the collection of admission. These changes were further implemented when Henley moved his enterprise to Lincoln's Inn Fields. The public was now willing to pay to be entertained, and Henley exploited this increasing commercialization of British society. By the 1770s, debating societies were firmly established in London society.

The year 1785 was pivotal: The Morning Chronicle announced on March 27:

 In 1780, 35 differently named societies advertised and hosted debates for anywhere between 650 and 1200 people. The question for debate was introduced by a president or moderator who proceeded to regulate the discussion. Speakers were given set amounts of time to argue their point of view, and, at the end of the debate, a vote was taken to determine a decision or adjourn the question for further debate. Speakers were not permitted to slander or insult other speakers, or diverge from the topic at hand, again illustrating the value placed on politeness by late 18th century debaters.

Student debating societies 

Princeton University in the future United States was home to a number of short-lived student debating societies throughout the mid-1700s. The American Whig Society at the university was co-founded in 1769 by future revolutionary James Madison.

The Dialectic and Philanthropic Societies were formed at the University of North Carolina at Chapel Hill in 1795 and are still active. They are considered the first of the post-revolutionary debating societies.

The first student debating society in Great Britain was the St Andrews Debating Society, formed in 1794 as the Literary Society. The Cambridge Union Society was founded in 1815 and claims to be the oldest continually operating debating society in the World.

Over the next few decades, similar debate societies emerged at several other prominent universities including the Oxford Union, the Yale Political Union, and the Conférence Olivaint.

Political debate

Parliamentary debate 

In parliaments and other legislatures, members debate proposals regarding legislation, before voting on resolutions which become laws. Debates are usually conducted by proposing a law, or changes to a law known as amendments. Parliamentary-style debates are structured with two opposing sides, the Leader of Opposition (LO) and the Government (GOV). After each side is given an opportunity to speak once, members are permitted to give reply speeches to the opposing sides points, after which, members of the parliament then discuss the proposal and cast their vote for or against such a law. The first example of parliamentary debate took place in Liverpool in 1882.

Although Britain invented the system of parliamentary debate, they are not the only modern country to use a parliamentary system. Countries today that use a parliamentary system and parliamentary debate include Canada, Italy, Japan, Latvia, the Netherlands, and New Zealand.

Emergency debating 
In some countries (e.g., Canada and the UK), members of parliament may request debates on urgent matters of national importance. If the Speaker grants such a request, an emergency debate is usually held before the end of the next sitting day.

Debate between candidates for high office 

In jurisdictions which elect holders of high political office, such as the president or prime minister, candidates sometimes debate in public, usually during a general election campaign.

U.S. presidential debates 

Since the 1976 general election, debates between presidential candidates have been a part of U.S. presidential campaigns.  Unlike debates sponsored at the high school or collegiate level, the participants and format are not independently defined.  Nevertheless, in a campaign season heavily dominated by television advertisements, talk radio, sound bites, and spin, they still offer a rare opportunity for citizens to see and hear the major candidates side by side.  The format of the presidential debates, though defined differently in every election, is typically more restrictive than many traditional formats, forbidding participants to ask each other questions and restricting discussion of particular topics to short time frames.

The presidential debates were initially moderated in 1976, 1980, and 1984 by the League of Women Voters, and the Commission on Presidential Debates (CPD) was established in 1987  by the Republican and Democratic parties. The presidential debate's primary purpose is to sponsor and produce debates for the United States presidential and vice-presidential candidates and to undertake research and educational activities relating to the debates. The organization, which is a nonprofit, nonpartisan corporation, sponsored all of the presidential debates in 1988, 1992, 1996, 2000, 2004, 2008, 2012, 2016, and 2020.

However, in announcing its withdrawal from sponsoring the debates, the League of Women Voters stated that it was withdrawing "because the demands of the two campaign organizations would perpetrate a fraud on the American voter."  In 2004, the Citizens' Debate Commission was formed in the hope of establishing an independent sponsor for presidential debates, with a more voter-centric role in the definition of the participants, format, and rules.

Competitive debating 

In competitive debates, teams compete against each other and are judged the winner by a list of criteria that is usually based around the concepts of "content, style, and strategy". There are numerous styles of competitive debating, organizations, and rules.

Competitive debating is carried out at the local, national, and international levels.

In schools and colleges, competitive debating often takes the form of a contest with explicit rules. It may be presided over by one or more judges or adjudicators. One side is in favor of the proposed status quo (also known as the "Affirmative", "Proposition", or "Pro" side) and one is opposed to the proposed status quo (also known as the "Negative", "Opposition", or "Con" side) of the resolution. The Pro side will attempt to support the resolution; the Con side must sufficiently refute these arguments. Both sides are required to embrace and defend their own positions, and will often debate both sides during a competition.

Forms of competitive debating

Australasia debating 

The Australasian style of debate consists of two teams of three people, debating a topic. The topic is presented in the form of an affirmative statement beginning with "That" or "This House", for example, "That cats are better than dogs", or "This House should raise taxes". Most topics are usually specific to local Australian regions to facilitate participant and audience interest.

Each of the six speakers (three affirmative and three negative) speak in succession to each other, beginning with the Affirmative Team. The speaking order is as follows: First Affirmative, First Negative, Second Affirmative, Second Negative, Third Affirmative, and finally Third Negative. The debate is finished with a closing argument by the last speaker from each team. "Points of Information" (an interrupting question or statement), more commonly known as "POIs," are used in Australian and New Zealand Secondary School level debating.

The context in which the Australasia style of debate is used varies, but in Australia and New Zealand is mostly used at the Primary and Secondary school level.

European square debating 
This is a Paris-style inspired format, with four teams with France, the United Kingdom, Germany always represented, and then one other major European nation (for example, Russia). These "Nations" then confront each other on a policy debate on European issues, as parts of two broad coalitions. Each team is composed of two speakers (the Prime Minister and the Foreign Secretary). The debate starts with the first speaker from France, followed by the first speaker of Germany (the opposite side), followed by the second speaker of France, and the second speaker of Germany. The debate continues with the first speaker of the United Kingdom, followed by the first speaker of Russia, and it goes on with the respective second speakers. Each debater speaks for 5 minutes. The first and the last minutes are protected time: no Points of Information may be asked. During the rest of the speech, the speaker may be interrupted by Points of Information (POIs) from the opposite countries (debaters from France and the UK may ask POIs to debaters representing Germany and Russia, and vice versa, respectively). The format forces each debater to develop a winning strategy while respecting the coalition. This format was commonly developed by the Franco-British Comparative Project and Declan McCavanna, Chairman of the FDA  and was featuring France, the UK, Germany, Russia and Italy.

Extemporaneous speaking 

Extemporaneous speaking is a style of debate, which involves no planning in advance, and two teams with a first and second speaker. While a majority of judges will allow debaters to cite current events and various statistics the only research permitted is the articles given to the debaters along with the resolution shortly before the debate. The debate begins with an affirmative first-speaker constructive speech, followed by a negative; then an affirmative and negative second-speaker constructive speech, respectively. Each of these speeches is six minutes in length and is followed by two minutes of cross-examination. There is then an affirmative and negative first-speaker rebuttal, and a negative and affirmative second-speaker rebuttal, respectively. These speeches are each four minutes long. No new points can be brought into the debate during the rebuttals.

This style of debate commonly centers on three main contentions (although a team can use more or less). In order for the affirmative side to win, all of the negative contentions must be defeated, and all of the affirmative contentions must be left standing. Most of the information presented in the debate must be tied in to support one of these contentions, or "signposted". Much of extemporaneous speaking is similar to public forum debate and policy debate. However, Extemporaneous Speech is considered in more areas, especially in the United States, as a form of Speech, which is considered separate from debate, or itself a form of debate with several types of events.

Impromptu debating 

Impromptu debating is a relatively informal style of debating when compared to other highly structured formats of debate. The topic for the debate is given to the participants between fifteen and twenty minutes before the debate starts. The debate format is relatively simple; each team member of each side speaks for five minutes, alternating sides. A ten-minute discussion period, similar to other formats' "open cross-examination" time follows, and then a five-minute break (comparable to other formats' preparation time). Following the break, each team gives a 4-minute rebuttal.

Impromptu debate is often considered to be more akin to Public Speaking since speeches can be anywhere between stand-up routines, to the reputations of nations, depending on the topic given to the contestants. Contestants will be given a list of abstract topics when the event begins and will create a speech on their chosen topic.

Jes debating 

This style of debate is particularly popular in Ireland at the secondary school level. Developed in Coláiste Iognáid (Galway) over the last ten years, the format has five speakers: two teams and a single 'sweep speaker' on each side. Speeches last 4:30 minutes with 30 seconds protected from POIs at either end of the debate. Adjudication will depend on BP (British Parliament) marking, but with particular recognition of principled debating. A ten-minute open house will also be adjudicated. Traditionally, the motion is always opposed to the final vote.

Lincoln–Douglas debating 

Lincoln-Douglas debating is primarily a form of United States high school debate (though there is collegiate Lincoln Douglas debate)  and is named after the 1858 Lincoln-Douglas debates.  It is a one-on-one event that applies philosophical theories to real-world issues. Debaters normally alternate sides from round to round as either the "affirmative", which upholds the resolution, or "negative", which attacks it. The resolution, which changes bimonthly, generally asks whether a certain policy or action conforms to a specific value.

Though established as an alternative to policy debate, there has been a strong movement to embrace certain techniques that originated in policy debate. Traditional L-D debate attempts to be free of policy debate "jargon". Lincoln-Douglas speeches can range in speed from a conversational pace to well over 300 words per minute. This technique of fast-talking is often called spreading, and is also prevalent in policy debates.

Mace debating 

The Mace debating style is prominent in Britain and Ireland at the school level and is composed of two teams of two people, debating a motion, which one team will propose, and the other will oppose.
Each speaker will make a seven-minute speech in the order; 1st Proposition, 1st Opposition, 2nd Proposition, 2nd Opposition. After the first minute of each speech, members of the opposing team may request a 'point of information' (POI). If the speaker accepts, they are permitted to ask a question. POI's are used to attack a speaker on a weak point or to argue against something the speaker said. After all four debaters have spoken, the debate will be opened to the floor, in which members of the audience will question the teams. Finally, one speaker from each team will speak for 4 minutes. In these summary speeches, the speaker will answer the questions posed by the floor and opposition, before summarizing their own key points. The MACE format of debate is designed to be beginner-friendly and to prepare students for BP Parliamentary debate (which it is modeled off).

Mock trial

Model United Nations

Moot court

Oxford-style debating 

Derived from the Oxford Union debating society of Oxford University, Oxford-style debating is a competitive debate format featuring a sharply assigned  motion that is proposed by one side and opposed by another.   Oxford-style debates follow a formal structure that begins with audience members casting a pre-debate vote on the motion that is either for, against, or undecided.  Each panelist presents a seven-minute opening statement, after which the moderator takes questions from the audience with inter-panel challenges. Finally, each panelist delivers a two-minute closing argument, and the audience delivers their second (and final) vote for comparison against the first.  A winner is then declared either by the majority or by which team has swayed more audience members between the two votes.

Paris-style debating 
In Paris debating, two teams of five debate a given motion. One team will attempt to defend the motion while the other team will attack the motion. The debate is judged on the quality of the arguments, the strength of the rhetoric, the charisma of the speaker, the quality of the humor, the ability to think on one's feet, and teamwork. Despite this format being specifically used in France debates are commonly held in English.

The first speaker of the Proposition (Prime Minister) opens the debate, followed by the first speaker of the Opposition (Shadow Prime Minister), then the second speaker of the Proposition, and so on.

Every speaker speaks for 6 minutes. After the first minute and before the last minute, debaters from the opposite team may ask Points of Information, which the speaker may accept or reject as he wishes (although they are supposed to accept at least two).

The French Debating Association organizes its National Debating Championship upon this style.

Parliamentary debating 

Parliamentary debate is conducted under rules originally derived from British parliamentary procedure, though parliamentary debate now has several variations, including American, Brazilian, British, Canadian, and German forms. It features the competition of individuals in a multi-person setting. It borrows terms such as "government" and "opposition" from the British parliament (although the term "proposition" is sometimes used rather than "government" when debating in the United Kingdom).

Parliamentary debate is practiced worldwide and many international variations have been created. The premier event in the world of parliamentary debate is the World Universities Debating Championship. This tournament is conducted in the traditional British Parliamentary style of debate.

Parliamentary debating (American) 

In the United States, the American Parliamentary Debate Association is the oldest national parliamentary debating organization, based on the East Coast and including the Ivy League. The more recently founded National Parliamentary Debate Association (NPDA) is now the largest collegiate sponsor.

Parliamentary debating (Brazilian) 

The Brazilian Parliamentary Debate involves a "proposition team", that will support the motion, and an "opposition team", who will oppose the motion. Unlike British Parliamentary debate, Brazilian debate uses the term "proposition", instead of "government", since [Brazil] has a congressional government rather than a [parliament]. Thus, teams can either support or oppose the topic in session on the Congress.  Therefore, the speakers at the debate are called "First Member of Proposition", "First Member of Opposition", "Second Member of Proposition", and so on.

It is the most used competitive debating style used in Brazil; it is used at the official competitions of the Instituto Brasileiro de Debates (Brazilian Institute of Debates). At Parli Brasil, every speaker speaks for 7 minutes, with 15 seconds of tolerance after that. After the first minute and before the last minute, debaters from the opposite team may ask Points of Information, which the speaker may accept or reject as they wish (although they are supposed to accept at least one).  Another major difference between the Brazilian scene and the Worlds is that Brazilian tournaments use to present themes weeks before the tournament, with the motion only being presented 15 minutes before the debate, as usual BP. Some tournaments, such as GV Debate and Open de Natal are changing this, too. The presence of themes makes some differences in the strategy in comparison to general parliamentary debate.

However, there is no unique model in Brazil because many club debates were created before the creation of "Parli Brazil"  and not all modified their rules. This is the case, for example, of the UFC Debate Society in Fortaleza ("Sociedade de Debates da UFC"), which was established in 2010. In 2013, UFRN Debate Society was created and implemented some changes based on the old "Clube de Debates de Natal". The model "Parli Brazil" only started its activities in 2014 with the realization of the I Brazilian Championship of Debates in the city of Belo Horizonte, making the second edition in the city of Fortaleza, and the third is scheduled to take place in the city of Florianópolis. Since then, they were also created UFSC Debate Society ("Sociedade de Debates da UFSC") in 2014 and the UFRJ Debate Society ("Sociedade de Debates da UFRJ") on June 25, 2015, and others.

Parliamentary debating (British) 

The British Parliamentary (BP) debate involves four teams: two "proposition" teams supporting the motion, and two "opposition" teams opposing (with one team opening the debate and one closing on each side). The closing team of each side must either introduce a new point or improve upon a previous point made by their opening team. In a competitive round, the teams are ranked first to fourth, with the first-place team receiving 3 points, the second receiving 2, the third receiving 1, and the fourth place receiving no points.  This is the style used by the World Universities Debating Championship (WUDC).

Parliamentary debating (Canadian) 

The Canadian Parliamentary debating style involves one "government" team and one "opposition" team.  On the "government" side, there is the "Prime Minister" and the "Minister of the Crown". On the "opposition" side, there is the "Leader of the Opposition" and the "Shadow Minister".  The debate is structured with each party speaking in a particular order and for a defined length of time. However, unlike a cross-examination style debate  another dominant debate style in Canada  Parliamentary debate involves parliamentary rules and allows interruptions for points of order.

In very few cases, the motion may be "squirrelable". This means that the assigned motion is not intended to be debated, and may even be a quote from a film or a song. The "government" team then "squirrels" the motion into something debatable by making a series of logical links between the proposed motion and the one they propose to debate. This makes the debate similar to a prepared debate for the "government" team and an impromptu debate for the "opposition" team.

In Canada, debating tournaments may involve a mix of parliamentary and cross-examination-style debate, or be entirely one style or the other. Competitive debating takes place in English, French, or bilingual style – in which approximately 50% of content must be in each language.

Parliamentary Open-Debating [OPD] (German) 
The offene parlamentarische Debatte (Open Parliamentary Debate, OPD) is a German competitive debating format. It was developed by the debate club Streitkultur Tübingen and was used for the first time in a tournament in 2001. It aims to combine the advantages of parliamentary debates and public audience debates: each of the two teams has three speakers, and in addition, the debate includes three independent "free speakers". Clubs using OPD exist in Germany, Austria, Switzerland, and Italy.

Policy debating 

Policy debate is a fast-paced form of debate mostly commonly practiced in the U.S. Policy debate is composed of two teams of two which will advocate for and against a resolution (typically a proposed policy for the United States federal government or an international organization).  Affirmative teams generally present a proposal to implement a specific modified form of the resolution called a plan. The negative will either try to disprove or undermine this plan or display that the opportunity costs of their opponent's plan are so great that it should not be implemented. Policy Debate is sometimes also referred to as cross-examination debate (shortened to CX) because of the 3-minute questioning periods following each constructive speech.

Public debating 

Public debate may mean simply debating by the public, or in public. The term is also used for a particular formal style of debate in a competitive or educational context. Two teams of two compete through six rounds of argument, giving persuasive speeches on a particular topic.

Public forum debating 

"Public forum" debating combines aspects of both policy debate and Lincoln-Douglas debate but makes them easily understood by the general public by having shorter speech lengths, that absence of jargon, and longer questioning periods, called "cross-fires", where the debaters interact. This form of debate is also designed to address current affairs, with topics that change monthly and address both U.S. policy and international issues. This form of debate is primarily found within the United States. The core basis of this type of debate is that anyone is eligible to become a judge for the debate, unlike the Policy debate or Lincoln-Douglas debate, which requires more experience in debate to judge.

Tibetan Buddhist debating 

This is a traditional Buddhist form of debating that was influenced by earlier Indian forms. Largely developed in Tibet, this style includes two individuals, one functioning as the Challenger (questioner) and the other as the Defender (answerer). The debaters must depend on their memorization of the points of doctrine, definitions, illustrations, and even whole text, together with their own measure of understanding gained from instruction and study.

Characteristics that uniquely define Tibetan Buddhist style of debating are ceremonial recitation and symbolic movements and hand gestures by debaters. At the opening of a debate, the standing Challenger claps his hands together and invokes Manjushri, who is the manifestation of the wisdom of all the Buddhas and, as such, is the special deity of debate.

When the Challenger first puts their question to the sitting Defender, their right hand is held above the shoulder at the level of their head, and the left hand is stretched forward with the palm turned upward. At the end of their statement, the Challenger punctuates by loudly clapping together their hands and simultaneously stomping their left foot. They then stylistically drawback their right hand slowly with the palm held upward and, at the same time, hold forth their left hand with the palm turned downward. Holding forth the left hand after clapping symbolizes closing the door to rebirth in samsara. The drawing back and upraising of the right hand symbolizes one's will to raise all sentient beings up out of samsara, cyclic existence, and to establish them in the omniscience of Buddhahood. The left hand represents "Wisdom" – the "antidote" to cyclic existence, and the right hand represents "Method" – the altruistic intention to become enlightened for the benefit of all. The clap represents a union of Method and Wisdom.

Turncoat debating 

In this style of debating, the same speaker shifts allegiance between "For" and "Against" the motion. It is a solo contest, unlike other debating forms. Here, the speaker is required to speak for 2 minutes "For the motion", 2 minutes "Against the motion", and finally draw up a 1-minute conclusion in which the speaker balances the debate. At the end of the fifth minute, the debate will be opened to the house, in which members of the audience will put questions to the candidate, which they will have to answer. In the Turncoat format, emphasis is on transitions, the strength of argument, and the balancing of opinions.

International groups and events

Asian Universities Debating Championship 

United Asian Debating Championship is the biggest university debating tournament in Asia, where teams from the Middle East to Japan  come to debate. It is traditionally hosted in Southeast Asia, where participation is usually highest compared to other parts of Asia.

Asian debates are largely an adaptation of the Australasian format. The only difference is that each speaker is given 7 minutes of speech time, and there will be points of information (POI) offered by the opposing team between the 2nd to 6th minutes of the speech. This means that the 1st and 7th minute is considered the 'protected' period where no POIs can be offered to the speaker.

The debate will commence with the Prime Minister's speech (first proposition) and will be continued by the first opposition. This alternating speech will go on until the third opposition. Following this, the opposition bench will give the reply speech. In the reply speech, the opposition goes first and then the proposition. The debate ends when the proposition ends the reply speech. 4 minutes is allocated for the reply speech, and no POI's can be offered during this time.

International Public Debate Association 

The International Public Debate Association (IPDA), inaugurated on February 15, 1997, at St. Mary's University (Texas) in San Antonio, Texas, is a national debate league currently active primarily in the United States. Among universities, it is unlikely that IPDA is the fastest growing debate association within the United States.  Although evidence-based arguments are used, the central focus of IPDA is to promote a debate format that emphasizes public speaking and real-world persuasion skills over the predominant use of evidence and speed. To further this goal, IPDA predominantly uses lay judges in order to encourage an audience-centered debate style.  Furthermore, although the main goal of the debater is to persuade the judge, IPDA also awards the best speakers within each tournament.

IPDA offers both "team debating" where two teams, consisting of two people, debate and individual debate.  In both team and individual debate a list of topics are given to the two sides thirty minutes before the start of the round.  A negotiation ensues to pick a topic.  The sides, one affirming the resolution and one negating the resolution, then prepare an opening speech, a cross-examination of the other side, and closing remarks for the round.

While most member programs of the International Public Debate Association are associated with colleges or universities, participation in IPDA tournaments is open to anyone whose education level is equivalent to high school graduate or higher.

World Universities Peace Invitational Debate (WUPID) 

WUPID is an invitational tournament that employs the BP or Worlds format of debating. It invites the top 30 debating institutions in accordance with the list provided by the World Debate Website administered by Colm Flynn. If any or some of the teams cannot participate then replacements would be called in from the top 60 teams or based on strong recommendations from senior members of the University Debating community.

WUPID was first held in December 2007, with Sydney University being crowned champion. The second installation in 2008 saw Monash taking the trophy home. The third WUPID was held in Universiti Putra Malaysia (UPM) in December 2009. The first two tournaments were co-hosted by Universiti Kuala Lumpur (UNIKL).

WUPID was the brainchild of Daniel Hasni Mustaffa, Saiful Amin Jalun, and Muhammad Yunus Zakariah. They were all former debaters for UPM who took part at all possible levels of debating, from the Malaysian nationals to the World Championship.

Youth Debate 
In youth debate, students typically either have classroom debates moderated and graded by teachers or they participate as pairs in inter-school debate competitions.

Structure

Classroom debate 
In classroom debates, the topics of the debate are related to course content and material and during the debate, students on either side put forth arguments and proposals relating to class content as well as defenses of their own argument against the opposing side. The teacher and peers of the students participating in the debate make up the judging panel and upon conclusion of the debate, the winners are announced and students are given constructive feedback about how well they understood the course material and how effective their arguments were.

Debate tournaments 
Inter-school youth debate tournaments typically follow the format of Policy debate with teams of two participating in three to five debate rounds about any topic and each round lasting around 90 minutes. Groups and organizations for youth that are under the nation-wide Urban debate league follow this model of debate.

Potential benefits and outcomes 
The main goals of classroom debate and inter-school debate tournaments are to encourage youth participation in debate, help students develop their communication and listening skills and ability to draw from given information, as well as to make and defend against arguments with logical and rational thinking. Another goal of youth debate is to serve underrepresented school districts and populations and to provide students in those areas with the tools and skills to succeed in their academics and in society. In fact, a major population of young students that are part of debate leagues are Black, Latinx, or receiving some form of financial assistance. Classroom debates and debate tournaments also provide spaces for youth to make their voices heard on public issues such as climate change, voter disenfranchisement, and immigration.

Several researchers state that participation in extracurricular activities like debate brings positive benefits for children including increased standardized test scores and better behavioral performance. Other researchers argue that there is no conclusive evidence that proves that there is a direct correlation between student participation in extracurriculars and behavioral or academic progress. Despite this, many debate organizations believe that extracurricurals, debate in particular, indeed have positive behavioral, social, and academic impacts on children like the Boston Debate League, a Boston-based organization that hosts debate competitions for middle and high-schoolers, stating that their mission is "to integrate argumentation and competitive debate into public schools in Boston to develop critical thinkers ready for college, career, and engagement with the world around them."

Other forms of debate

Online debating 

With the increasing popularity and availability of the Internet, differing opinions arise frequently.  Though they are often expressed via flaming and other forms of argumentation, which consist primarily of assertions, formalized debating websites do exist. The debate-style varies from site to site, with local communities and cultures developing. Some sites promote a contentious atmosphere that can border on "flaming" (the personal insult of your opponent, also known as a type of ad hominem fallacy), while others strictly admonish such activities and strongly promote independent research and better arguments.

debatewise.org, debateart.com and debate.club are known as debate portals. Rulesets on various sites usually serve to enforce or create a good culture with the site's owner, or in some more open communities, the community itself. Managing post content, style, and access combine with frequent use of "reward" systems (such as reputation, titles, and forum permissions) to promote activities seen as productive while discouraging unwelcomed actions. Those cultures vary sufficiently that most styles can find a forum. Some online debate communities and forums practice Policy Debate through uploaded speeches and preset word counts to represent time limits present in the offline debate. Those online debates typically feature long periods of theoretical prep time, as well as the ability to research during a round or to step away from attending online.

Originally most debate sites were little more than online or bulletin boards. Since then, site-specific development has become increasingly common in facilitating different debate styles.  A popular entertainment contributor online is 'Epic Rap Battles of History', available on YouTube.

Debate shows 

Debates have also been made into a television show genre.

See also 

 Debates
 Conversation
 Dialectics
 Public speaking
 Disputation
International high-school debating
 Heart of Europe Debating Tournament
 World Individual Debating and Public Speaking Championships
 World Schools Debating Championships
 National High School Debate League of China
International university debating

 Debate camp#Popular camps/institutes
 Australasian Intervarsity Debating Championships
 American Parliamentary Debate Association
 Canadian University Society for Intercollegiate Debate
 International Public Debate Association
 National Association of Urban Debate Leagues
 North American Debating Championship
 North American Public Speaking Championship
 World Universities Debating Championship
 World Universities Debating Championship in Spanish

References

External links 

 Brazilian Institute of Debates